Omer Fedi (born 25 March 2000) is an Israeli record producer, songwriter and guitarist from Tel Aviv. He has co-written, produced and performed on "Mood" by 24kGoldn ft. Iann Dior, "Montero (Call Me By Your Name)" by Lil Nas X, and "Stay" by the Kid Laroi and Justin Bieber, all of which peaked at number one on the Billboard Hot 100, the Kid Laroi and Juice Wrld's platinum single "Go!" and Machine Gun Kelly's Tickets to My Downfall album which peaked at number one on the Billboard 200. He was included on XXL magazine's list of the "best hip hop producers of 2020".

Early life
His father, Asher Fedi, is a drummer who MTV described as "one of the most accomplished and well-respected drummers in Israel". His father taught him to play drums from a young age, however at ten he began pursuing guitar instead, inspired by Drake Bell's character in Drake & Josh. At age 16, Fedi and his father moved to Los Angeles in order to find further musical opportunities, where Fedi then enrolled in Calabasas High School. Joining his high school's jazz ensemble, his playing soon began drawing audiences from outside of the regular parent attendees. A jazz clinician he worked with as part of the ensemble said Fedi "could speak through the instrument" when he played guitar.

In 2018, he entered the Reno Jazz Festival, where he won the "Outstanding Performer" award, against over 9,000 other contestants. Within the following year, he was approached by songwriter Sam Hook to collaborate. Fedi says that he had never written a song until then, but he worked with Hook every day after school.

Career
Working with Sam Hook, Fedi began writing songs for artists like Ella Mai. He started working with Yungblud shortly after he finished high school and started branching out to other artists as well. Fedi soon met 24kGoldn at a party, then they started writing together just a week later.

Beginning in March 2020, Fedi began performing on Machine Gun Kelly's COVID-19 lockdown session, where he covered songs such as "Misery Business" and "Waiting on the World to Change". On 31 March 2020, "City of Angels" by 24kGoldn was released, which Fedi co-wrote, produced and performed on. On 12 June, "Go!" by the Kid Laroi featuring Juice Wrld was released, which Fedi produced. On the same day, I'm Gone by Iann Dior was released, which Fedi produced and composed. On 21 July, Fedi co-wrote and performed on Mood by 24kGoldn featuring Iann Dior, which was released on 24 July 2020, which peaked at number one and remained in the charts for 33 weeks. On the same day, the Kid Laroi's mixtape F*ck Love was released, which Fedi produced and helped compose. On November 6th, "Without You" was released along with the "F*ck Love" deluxe titled F*ck Love Savage by the Kid Laroi was released, which Fedi co-wrote, composed and produced. The song peaked at number 34 on the Billboard Hot 100. He performed guitar and bass and co-produced on Machine Gun Kelly's album Tickets to My Downfall, which was released on 25 September, and peaked at number one on the Billboard 200. On 4 December, Yungblud's album Weird! was released, which Fedi performed on.

He performed on and produced Lil Nas X's song "Montero (Call Me by Your Name)", which was released on 26 March 2021. The same day 24kGoldn's El Dorado album was released, which Fedi also performed on and produced. On 21 May 2021, Sun Goes Down, the second single from Lil Nas X's album Montero was released, which Fedi co-wrote and co-produced.  He produced the Kid Laroi and Justin Bieber's single "Stay" which was released on 9 July 2021.

Discography

Filmography

References

External links

Omer Fedi Net Worth at Celeb Worth

Musicians from Tel Aviv
Israeli guitarists
2000 births
Israeli record producers
Male guitarists
Israeli male songwriters
Living people